The Loneliest Time is the sixth studio album by Canadian singer Carly Rae Jepsen. It was released on October 21, 2022, through 604 Records in Canada, and School Boy and Interscope Records in the United States. The album was preceded by the release of its lead single, "Western Wind", which was followed by "Beach House", "Talking to Yourself", the title track, "The Loneliest Time" and "Surrender My Heart" The album received positive reviews and was placed in several lists of best of the year. In support of the album, Jepsen embarked on The So Nice Tour, which began in September 2022.

Background
In May 2020, Jepsen revealed that she had recorded an "entire quarantine album" during the lockdown. Jepsen spoke to The Guardian that she was writing songs over Zoom alongside longtime collaborator Tavish Crowe.

While discussing the album in an interview with Crack, Jepsen stated she wanted to be less conscious of the decades she's been moving. Instead, she was inspired by various styles, including 80s pop, 70s folk, funk, and disco. Jepsen also explained she wanted to become more self-reflective and analytical of her own behaviours:I had the playground of all the eras to jump from, and this was more just writing from the heart, in whatever direction the songs wanted to go, ... It excited me to have those moments of flirtation on the [new] album, but also broaden the spectrum of what the subject of a pop song was allowed to be...

In an interview with The Ringer, Jepsen teased the possibility of releasing a Loneliest Time B-Sides, like she did with her previous albums Emotion (2015) and Dedicated (2019), stating that "there's 65 [B-sides] that I've listened to that I could make something of..."

Promotion
"Western Wind" was released as the lead single on May 6, 2022. The album was made available to pre-order on August 2. Second single "Beach House" was released August 5, third single "Talking to Yourself" was released September 16, and the fourth single, the title track featuring Rufus Wainwright, was released October 7.

On September 21, Jepsen embarked on her fourth concert tour across North America, The So Nice Tour. While on tour, she announced more dates in the United Kingdom (Europe) and Australia. The tour will finish on March 14, 2023.

Critical reception 

The Loneliest Time received generally positive reviews from music critics; at Metacritic, which assigns a normalized rating out of 100 to reviews from mainstream critics, the album received a score of 79 out of 100 based on 17 reviews.

Rob Sheffield of Rolling Stone wrote "The Loneliest Time is her most "emotionally adventurous" music yet—"high-gloss post-bubblegum synth-pop that packs a serious punch even at its fizziest." Hannah Mylrea of NME awarded the album four out of five stars, writing that The Loneliest Time "sees Jepsen's now signature sonics infused with more expansive influences, although never deferring too far from the tried and trusted sounds of past." Reviewing the album for AllMusic, Heather Phares concluded that Jepsen's, "charm holds together The Loneliest Time's whirlwind of daydreams, confessions, and decades of pop allusions", calling it "another strong album" from her. Olivia Horn of Pitchfork complimented certain aspects of the production, but criticized some of its "corny" lyrics and the lack of focus. Gem Stokes of Clash said the album is "a far cry from the saccharine star that launched Jepsen's career but proves her musical pliability."

The album was nominated for Pop Album of the Year at the Juno Awards of 2023.

Rankings

Commercial performance
In Jepsen's homeland, Canada, The Loneliest Time debuted at number 18 on the Canadian Albums Chart. In the neighboring United States, the album charted at number 19 on the Billboard 200, with about 20,000 total units sold in its first week, marking Jepsen's fourth top twenty album. It further debuted at number 16 on the UK Albums Chart, becoming her highest-peaking album in the UK in ten years.

Track listing

Notes
  indicates an additional producer
  indicates a vocal producer

Personnel
Musicians

 Carly Rae Jepsen – vocals
 Tavish Crowe – musical direction
 Imad Royal – background vocals, bass, drums, guitar (1)
 Max Hershenow – background vocals, drums (1)
 Luke Niccoli – bass, drums, guitar, keyboards, programming (2)
 Benjamin Berger – background vocals, programming (3)
 Ryan Rabin – background vocals (3)
 Trevor Rabin – guitar (3)
 Simon Wilcox – programming (3)
 Nathan Jenkins – bass, synthesizer (4, 7); vocal programming (7)
 Liam Hutton – drums (4)
 Jordan Palmer – drums, guitar, synthesizer (5, 10); bass (10)
 John Hill – drums (5), guitar (5, 10), bass (10)
 Nate Cyphert – background vocals (6, 9, 13, 16)
 Alex Hope – guitar, programming, synthesizer (6)
 Rob Cohen – programming (6)
 Tony Marino – vocals (6)
 Bobby Wooten – vocals (6)
 Ben Romans – vocals (6)
 Joey Hendricks – vocals (6)
 Jared Manierka – vocals (6)
 Rostam Batmanglij – acoustic guitar, bass, electric guitar, piano, synthesizer (8, 12); clapping, conga, drums, organ, programming, shaker, tambourine (8); drum programming, Hammond B3, mandolin, percussion, sitar (12)
 Andrew Tachine – conga, drums, tambourine (8)
 Joey Messina-Doerning – conga (8)
 Kyle Shearer – bass, programming (9, 13, 16); guitar (9, 16); background vocals, drums, synthesizer (13)
 Georgia Greene – background vocals (12)
 Quinn D'Andrea – background vocals (12)
 Lauren Jones – background vocals (12)
 Andrew Bulbrook – violin (12)
 Cara Fox – cello (13)
 Cody Fry – string arrangement (13, 16)
 Avery Bright – violin (13)
 Elizabeth Lamb – violin (13)
 Emily Kohavi – violin (13)
 Cassie Morrow – violin (13)
 Rufus Wainwright – vocals (13)
 Oliver Lundström – bass, guitar, programming, synthesizer (14)
 Cristoffer Cantillo – drums (15)
 Evan Smith – flute (15)
 Patrik Berger – programming (15)

Technical

 Emily Lazar – mastering
 Chris Allgood – mastering
 Tom Norris – mixing, engineering (1, 2, 5, 10)
 Rob Kinelski – mixing, engineering (3)
 Anthony Dolhai – mixing (4, 7, 14), engineering (4, 7)
 Mitch McCarthy – mixing, engineering (6)
 Shawn Everett – mixing, engineering (8)
 James Krausse – mixing, engineering (9, 13, 16)
 Nathan Phillips – mixing, engineering (11)
 Geoff Swan – mixing, engineering (12)
 Davey Badiuk – mixing (14)
 Jamie Snell – mixing (15)
 Imad Royal – engineering (1)
 Max Hershenow – engineering (1)
 Luke Niccoli – engineering (2)
 Jordan Palmer – engineering (2)
 Captain Cuts – engineering (3)
 Eli Heisler – engineering (3)
 Nathan Jenkins – engineering (4)
 Rostam Batmanglij – engineering (8, 12)
 Joey Messina-Doerning – engineering (8, 12)
 Kyle Shearer – engineering (9, 13, 16)
 Rob Cohen – engineering (10)
 Jared Fox – engineering (13)
 Ivan Wayman – additional engineering (8)
 Matt Cahill – additional engineering (12)
 Niko Battistini – additional engineering (12)
 Travis Pavur – engineering assistance (8)

Visuals
 Jolie Clemens – creative direction, art direction, design
 Meredith Jenks – photography
 Alexis Franklin – painting of Carly's eye
 Hayley Atkin – styling
 Jenna Remy – fashion assistant
 Jon Liekcfelt – hair
 Gregory Arlt – makeup

Charts

Release history

References

2022 albums
Carly Rae Jepsen albums
604 Records albums
Interscope Records albums
Schoolboy Records albums